The siege of Pondicherry in 1760-1761, was a conflict in the Third Carnatic War, as part of the global Seven Years' War.  Lasting from 4 September 1760 to 15 January 1761, British land and naval forces besieged and eventually compelled the French garrison defending the French colonial outpost of Pondicherry to surrender.  The city was running low on supplies and ammunitions when French commander Lally surrendered. It was the third British victory in the region that was under the command of Robert Clive.

See also 
Battle of Pondicherry

References
 Fortescue's History of the British Army

Battles of the East Indies Campaign (1757–1763)
Siege of Pondicherry
Conflicts in 1760
Conflicts in 1761
Battles involving French India
Battles of the Seven Years' War
Sieges involving British India
Siege of Pondicherry
Siege of Pondicherry
Siege of
ondicherry
Siege of Pondicherry
Siege of Pondicherry
Third Carnatic War